2nd Live is the second live album by Dutch hard rock band Golden Earring, released in 1981 (see 1981 in music). The album was not issued in the U.S.

Track listing
All songs written by Hay and Kooymans except where noted.

CD 1
"Don't Stop the Show" (Gerritsen, Hay, Kooymans, Zuiderwijk)
"My Town"
"No for an Answer"
"Heart Beat" (Gerritsen, Hay, Kooymans, Zuiderwijk)
"Save Your Skin" (Gerritsen, Hay, Kooymans, Zuiderwijk)
"I Don't Wanna Be Nobody Else"
"Long Blond Animal"

CD 2
"Prisoner of the Night"
"Weekend Love" (Gerritsen, Hay, Kooymans, Zuiderwijk)
"Sleepwalkin'"
"I Do Rock N Roll"
"Slow Down" (Larry Williams)
"Buddy Joe"
"Back Home"

Personnel
Rinus Gerritsen – bass, keyboard
Barry Hay – flute, Vocals, guitar
George Kooymans – guitar, vocals
Cesar Zuiderwijk – drums

Charts

References

Golden Earring live albums
1981 live albums
Polydor Records live albums